Shirley Kuo (born 25 January 1930) is a Taiwanese politician.

Kuo earned a doctorate in economics from Kobe University in Japan after receiving bachelor's and master's degrees from National Taiwan University and Massachusetts Institute of Technology, respectively. Upon her appointment to the Ministry of Finance, Kuo became the first female cabinet minister in the history of the Republic of China. She led the ministry from 1988 to 1990, before being named the head minister of the Council for Economic Planning and Development, a position she held until 1993. 

She was married to Ni Wen-ya until his death in 2006. A daughter from her first marriage, Christina Liu, was finance minister in 2012. Peng Ming-min is her first cousin.

References

1930 births
Living people
Politicians of the Republic of China on Taiwan from Tainan
Taiwanese Ministers of Finance
Female finance ministers
Kobe University alumni
National Taiwan University alumni
Massachusetts Institute of Technology alumni
Women government ministers of Taiwan
Spouses of Chinese politicians
Spouses of Taiwanese politicians